Kim Conley (born 14 March 1986 in Slough, United Kingdom) is an American track and field athlete, who competes in middle and long distance track events. She finished in third place at the 2012 U.S. Olympic Trials to qualify for the 2012 Olympics in the 5,000 meters, where she finished twelfth in her heat.

She made her second U.S Olympic team in the 5,000m, where she finished 12th in the first round of competition.

High school
Running for Montgomery High School in Santa Rosa, California, Conley was not even the best on her team, that position being held by Sara Bei, the CIF California State Meet Champion at 3200 meters during her freshman year.  By her senior year, she managed to get to the State Meet, qualifying in both the 3,200 meters and the 1600 meters, but foregoing the longer race to try to make the final in the 1,600 meters.  However, she was only the 19th best qualifier, well behind Anne St. Geme (daughter of American Junior 3,000 meters record holder Ceci Hopp).

College
Conley ran track and cross country at UC Davis and was a volunteer assistant coach for the Aggies through 2014. She was the 2004 Division I Independent cross country champion in 17:07 as a freshman, then added her second All Division I Independent honor by placing seventh the following year as a sophomore.

In 2008, Conley helped make program history by becoming the first UC Davis Aggie to qualify for the NCAA Division I Outdoor Track and Field Championships. She earned All-West Region with her 12th-place showing at the regional, earning her the berth at the national meet. Conley earned all-conference or equivalent honors three times. Conley captured All Big West Conference accolades with a seventh-place showing. Conley was UC Davis' top runner in all 4 meets as a freshman, all 7 meets as a sophomore, all 5 meets as a junior, and every meet as a senior.

Conley's time of 16:17.51 set at the 2008 NCAA Track and Field West Regional in the 5,000 meters stands as a school record and her mark of 4:22.17 in the 1,500 meters currently ranks her No. 2 on UC Davis' all-time ledger. Conley is ninth in the UC Davis outdoor 800 meters (2:10.73) and the UC Davis outdoor 3,000 meters (9:45.85) lists and owns the UC Davis indoor 3,000 meters record with a time of 9:19.16.

2012 USATF Olympic Trials
Conley qualified for the finals of the 5000 metres at the 2012 United States Olympic Trials, but did not have the 'A' standard time meaning that even if she won the trials she would not qualify for the 2012 Olympics.  During the race Julia Lucas pushed the pace, but Lucas faded at the end of the race. Conley passed Lucas in the final meter, where she defeated Lucas by 4/100ths of a second and surpassed the 'A' standard by 21/100ths of a second.

2012 London Olympics
Conley ran 15:14.48 for the semifinals of the Athletics at the 2012 Summer Olympics – Women's 5000 metres.

2013 US Outdoor Championships
2013 USA Outdoor Track and Field Championships 5000m on 23 June 2013; 4th place; 15:37.80

2013 World Championships
Conley qualified for the 2013 World Championships in Athletics.
IAAF World Championships 5000m final on 17 August 2013 ; 12th place; 15:36.58
IAAF World Championships 5000m prelim on 14 August 2013 ; 5th place; 15:27.35

2014 US Outdoor Championships
After pushing the pace for the last 8 laps, Conley was passed in the last 200 meters by Jordan Hasay.  But Conley came back and outsprinted Hasay in the last 100 meters to win the 10,000 meters title in 32:02.07 on June 26.

2014 Road Racing
Kim Conley placed 2nd in 1:15:41 on October 26, 2014 at Healdsburg Wine Country Half Marathon.

2015 Road Racing
Kim Conley won the USATF 2015 USA Half Marathon Championship in Houston, Texas on Sunday, January 18, 2015.

2016 Rio Games
Kim Conley on December 6, 2015 ran 31:58.54 at Hornet Stadium (Sacramento), Sacramento State University to meet the 2016 Olympic Standard.

She ran 15:09 at the UW Invite 5K for her 5000m olympic standard. On 27 May 2016, Kim ran 15:10.69 5000 m at Prefontaine Classic.

At the U.S. Olympic Trials, she ran 15:10.62, initially securing the 3rd spot for the 5,000m, but ended up with the second spot after Molly Huddle gave up her top spot to focus on the 10,000m.

In the 2016 Olympic Games, Conley finished 12th in the 1st round of the 5,000m in 15:34.39.

2017 US Outdoor Championship

References

Living people
1986 births
American female long-distance runners
American female middle-distance runners
University of California, Davis alumni
Olympic track and field athletes of the United States
Athletes (track and field) at the 2012 Summer Olympics
Athletes (track and field) at the 2016 Summer Olympics
Sportspeople from Slough
People from Santa Rosa, California
Athletes (track and field) at the 2019 Pan American Games
Pan American Games bronze medalists for the United States
Pan American Games medalists in athletics (track and field)
Pan American Games track and field athletes for the United States
USA Outdoor Track and Field Championships winners
Medalists at the 2019 Pan American Games
21st-century American women